Catherine Capdevielle (born 2 September 1938) is a retired French sprinter. She competed at the 1956 and 1960 Olympics in various sprint events and finished fifth in the 100 m in 1960. She won a bronze medal in the 100 m at the 1959 Summer Universiade.

References

External links
 

1938 births
Living people
Sportspeople from Pyrénées-Atlantiques
French female sprinters
Olympic athletes of France
Athletes (track and field) at the 1956 Summer Olympics
Athletes (track and field) at the 1960 Summer Olympics
Universiade medalists in athletics (track and field)
Universiade bronze medalists for France
Medalists at the 1959 Summer Universiade
Olympic female sprinters